Willisau railway station is a railway station in the municipality of Willisau, in the Swiss canton of Lucerne. It is an intermediate stop on the standard gauge Huttwil–Wolhusen line of BLS AG.

Services 
The following services stop at Willisau:

 Lucerne S-Bahn:
 : rush-hour service to Lucerne.

References

External links 
 
 

Railway stations in the canton of Lucerne
BLS railway stations